The cierzo is a strong, dry and usually cold wind that blows from the North or Northwest through the regions of Aragon, La Rioja and Navarra in the Ebro valley in Spain. It takes place when there is an anticyclone in the Bay of Biscay and a low-pressure area in the Mediterranean Sea.

On February 17, 1954, a gust with direction 290 of 135 km/h was recorded at the Zaragoza Airport observatory. It is known since ancient times, and its name stems from the Latin word circius, which probably came from an Iberian word. Cato the Elder described it in the 2nd century BC as "a wind that fills your mouth and tumbles waggons and armed men."
It reaches a speed of more than 100 km/h several times each year. Its maximum recorded speed has been 160 km/h in July 1956. It is more usual in autumn and winter, when larger pressure gradients take place, but a small pressure difference along the Ebro valley is sufficient to initiate a cierzo wind in any season.

The cierzo wind is similar to the mistral of the Rhone valley in France or the bora in the Balcans. The cierzo conditions life in the Ebro Valley because it is a drying wind and plants must fight against the dryness that the cierzo produces in the climate. Likewise, farmers must protect their orchard crops with reed barriers or tree plantations, which are called pareteras de caña, enramadas, abrigaños or bardos.

References 

Winds